is a former Grand Prix motorcycle road racer from Japan. He enjoyed his best season in  when he finished the season in ninth place in the 500cc world championship. His best GP qualifying position was fourth place, which he achieved several times that season.

Yatsushiro won the following titles in domestic competition: 1981 Novice 250cc Japanese Champion (Yamaha), 1983 Formula One Japanese Champion (Kawasaki), 1984 Formula One Japanese Champion (Honda).

Grand Prix career statistics

Points system from 1969 to 1987:

Points system from 1988 to 1992:

(key) (Races in bold indicate pole position; races in italics indicate fastest lap)

References 

1960 births
People from Kanoya, Kagoshima
Japanese motorcycle racers
500cc World Championship riders
Living people